Ernst Akiba/Akiva Simon (March 15, 1900 in Berlin – August 18, 1988 in Jerusalem) was a German-Jewish educator and religious philosopher.

Biography
In the 1920s, Ernst Simon co-founded Brit Shalom along with Martin Buber, an organization espousing a binational solution for promoting the co-existence of Jews and Arabs in the State of Israel. From 1930 to 1933 he taught at the Hebrew Reali School Haifa, headed by Arthur Biram. In 1942, he was one of the founders of the binationalist Ihud party.

Published works 
 Aufbau im Untergang. Jüdische Erwachsenenbildung im nationalsozialistischen Deutschland als geistiger Widerstand. Tübingen: Mohr 1959. (Schriftenreihe wissenschaftlicher Abhandlungen des Leo Baeck Institute of Jews from Germany. 2).
 Brücken. Gesammelte Aufsätze. Heidelberg: Schneider 1965.
 Selbstdarstellung. In: Pädagogik in Selbstdarstellungen. Hamburg: Meiner, Bd. 1  (1975), S. 272–333.
 Entscheidung zum Judentum. Essays und Vorträge. Frankfurt a.M.: Suhrkamp Verlag 1980. (Bibliothek Suhrkamp. 641).
 Sechzig Jahre gegen den Strom. Briefe von 1917-1984. Hrsg. vom Leo-Baeck-Institut, Jerusalem. Tübingen: Mohr Siebeck 1998. (Schriftenreihe wissenschaftlicher Abhandlungen des Leo-Baeck-Instituts. 59).

Awards and recognition 

In 1967, Simon was awarded the Israel Prize, for education.

See also 
List of Israel Prize recipients

References

Further reading 
 Rudolf Lennert: Über das Leben der deutschen Sprache in Jerusalem. In: Neue Sammlung. Göttingen. Bd. 6 (1966) S. 617-627 (über Ernst Simon, Ludwig Strauss and Werner Kraft).
 Jan Woppowa in: Biographisch-bibliographisches Kirchenlexikon. Begr. und hrsg. von Friedrich Wilhelm Bautz. Fortgef. von [Traugott Bautz]. Bd. 21 (2003) Sp. 1439–1446.
 
 Kurzinformation des Moses-Mendelssohn-Zentrum der Universität Potsdam
 Ephraim Chamiel, Between Religion and Reason - The Dialectical Position in Contemporary Jewish Thought, Academic Studies Press, Boston 2020, part I, pp. 98-107.

20th-century German educators
Israeli people of German-Jewish descent
20th-century Israeli philosophers
Philosophers of Judaism
Zionists
Israel Prize in education recipients
1899 births
1988 deaths
German emigrants to Mandatory Palestine